"The Danish Way to Rock" is a Danish language 2010 FIFA World Cup theme song for Denmark and a hit single by Danish  band Nephew featuring Landsholdet (meaning "the national team" in Danish). The song went straight into #1 in the Tracklisten, the Danish Singles Chart.

"The Danish Way to Rock" was a song written in Danish (despite its English language title) by Nephew band member Simon Kvamm and music by the band Nephew and arranged and produced by Nephew and Carsten Heller. The song was released in cooperation with the Dansk Boldspil-Union (DBU), the Danish Football Association for the support of the 2010 Danish National Football Team.

Recording
The song was recorded on 1 March 2010. That day, the members of the Danish band Nephew and vocalist Simon Kvamm and guitarist Kristian Riis accompanied by song producer Carsten Heller travelled to Vienna, Austria, where the Danish national team was scheduled to compete and briefed the team of the song and their part. Some players notably Daniel Jensen and Nicklas Bendtner recorded their parts separately, then a collective take was made of the entire group singing in a hotel room. Footage of the recording process was made available.

Credits
Lyrics: Simon Kvamm
Music: Nephew
Arrangement: Nephew and Carsten Heller
Drums: Søren Arnholt
Bas: Kasper Toustrup
Vocals and keys: Simon Kvamm
Guitars: Kristian Riis
Keys: René Munk Thalund
Chorus vocals by Landsholdet/Denmark national football team
Additional vocals: Søren Arnholt and Kristian Riis
Production, recording and mix: Carsten Heller
Recorded at Carsten Heller
Player chorus recorded at Courtyard Vienna Messe Hotel
Additional recordings at Walkie Talkie Boy Studio, Coach Studio and Funkydev Studio

Chart performance

The single was released in March 2010 and reached #1 on chart of 23 April 2010 staying 1 week at the top of the Danish Singles Chart.

References

External links
"The Danish Way to Rock" Facebook page

2010 singles
Number-one singles in Denmark
Denmark at the 2010 FIFA World Cup
2010 songs